Las pellizcadas de Margara was a television show from the Mexican TV network Telehit hosted by Eduardo España in his character Doña Margara Francisca.

External links
 Las pellizcadas de Margara official website

TeleHit original programming